Queerbaiting is a marketing technique for fiction and entertainment in which creators hint at, but then do not depict, same-sex romance or other LGBTQ+ representation. The purpose is to attract ("bait") an LGBTQ+ or straight ally audience with the suggestion or possibility of relationships or characters that appeal to them. 

Queerbaiting has been observed in popular culture and fiction such as films, television series, books, music, ads, various forms of media, but also in celebrities who convey an ambiguous sexual identity through their works and statements. The term arose in and has been popularized through discussions in Internet fandom since the early 2010s. It comes from a larger history of LGBTQ+ discourse in media representation dating back to the 1970s from subtle marketing to LGBTQ+ people through commercials and books.

Assessments

Queer audience concerns
Queer fans have reacted with concern and anger to an identity they consider defining being used as a mere marketing ploy, a plaything for creatives, a mark of "edginess", or a commodity.

Fans have derided, for instance, queer characters being used as plot devices rather than as characters for their own sake. For instance, Glee, a series with many queer series regulars, was criticized by fans for presenting "superficial stereotypes of queerness for dramatic effect".

Queer fans consider queerbaiting as "a way to throw us a bone when we normally wouldn't have anything, to acknowledge that we're there in the audience when the powers that be would prefer to ignore us".  Emmet Scout wrote that "queerbaiting works on its audience because it offers the suggestion that queer people do have a vital place in these stories, that they might even be the defining figures, the heroes. The suggestion—but not the reality." Rose Bridges summarized the practice's effect on queer fans as receiving "just enough [representation] to keep us interested, but not enough to satisfy us and make us truly represented."

Critiques 
Critics of those who engage in queerbaiting discourse point to its similarity, and perhaps confusion by audiences, with subtext. Subtext became popular in media, especially in film, during the 1930s due to the Hays Code which limited what can be shown on screen. The use of subtext has been a literary ploy to tell a variety of stories since. However, those who engage with queerbaiting discourse argue that LGBT representation no longer needs to be in the shadows of media. Instead of adding artistic value, queer fans view this tactic as perpetuating LGBT marginalization.

Societal shifts
According to media scholars, the perceived increase in queerbaiting reflects a shift towards a more positive perception of queer relationships in modern societies—and therefore, in a sense, societal progress. However, the same societal shift has also increased expectations by queer fans as to the quality and authenticity of queer representation—they demand not just any representation at all, but rather "respectful and meaningful depictions" of their relationships. That is why, according to media researcher Eve Ng, the ambiguous sexuality projected by twentieth-century entertainers such as David Bowie, Elton John and Madonna was not scrutinized to the same degree as that of their successors.

Various businesses and corporations, such as Starbucks, Ben & Jerry's, and Tylenol have showcased queer people and queer families in advertisements, helping to normalize and increase awareness surrounding the queer community.

Queerbaiting has brought the spending power of the queer community to light, and businesses make economic decisions that promote and support the queer community and its representation that ultimately entices the pink dollar. Terms associated with the queer community, like pink money, have shown the importance of queer people within an economy and a society.

In May 2020, reviewer Sophie Perry, writing for a lesbian lifestyle magazine, Curve, noted how queerbaiting has long endured in LGBT representation, noting how She-Ra and Harley Quinn both had same-sex kisses, happening within stories that could have turned out to be "typical queerbaiting" but did not. Perry added that the "queer conclusion" of the show is thanks to ND Stevenson, describing it as very different from the conclusion of The Legend of Korra, which confirmed Korra and Asami's relationship but left it "purposefully ambiguous" so it could air on a children's network. She concluded by calling She-Ra and the Princesses of Power culturally significant, and added that as more creative queer people come to the fore, inevitably queerbaiting will "become a thing of the past".

In March 2021, a writer for Vanity Fair, Joanna Robinson asked when "queer coding" veers into the territory of "queer baiting", with Dana Terrace saying it happens a "lot in modern anime", and Robinson saying this is also seen in shows like the end of Supernatural or the "hubbub around Finn and Poe in The Rise of Skywalker".

Examples

Companies and brands 
Disney has been accused of queerbaiting on several occasions, with Kodi Maier of the University of Hull arguing that "Disney is willing to create animated films and television shows that suggest queer content, but only so long as it doesn’t damage its conservative image." The directors of Avengers: Endgame had spoken in interviews about believing it was "a perfect time" to include queer representation in the franchise, however, it turned out to be a single line said by an unnamed secondary character in the film. The Rise of Skywalker faced similar criticism after director J.J. Abrams stated in the promotional press tour for the film that he had included queer representation in the film, but it turned out to be a single shot of a kiss in the background of one scene. A number of other Disney films, including the 2017 Beauty and the Beast film and Cruella were promoted as having queer characters (in some cases promoted as having Disney's first openly queer character), yet in each case the portrayal of queerness on screen was either just hinted at or a brief background that could easily be missed.

Fiction

The following characters, or relationships between characters of the same sex, have also been interpreted as examples of queerbaiting by at least some reliable media sources. This interpretation is not necessarily shared by all critics or fans.

Television

 Once Upon A Time: Emma Swan and Regina Mills.
 2 Broke Girls: Max Black and Caroline Channing.
 9-1-1: Evan "Buck" Buckley and Edmundo "Eddie" Diaz.
 Buffy The Vampire Slayer: Buffy and Faith.
 Doctor Who: The Doctor and Yasmin Khan.
 Glee: Rachel Berry and Quinn Fabray.
Line of Duty: Joanne Davidson and Kate Fleming.
 Riverdale: Betty Cooper and Veronica Lodge, and Archie Andrews and Joaquin DeSantos.
 Rizzoli & Isles: Jane Rizzoli and Maura Isles.
 Sherlock: Sherlock Holmes and John Watson. Cast and crew of Sherlock have consistently denied that the relationship is intended to be seen as romantic, to the dismay of many fans.
 Supergirl: Kara Danvers and Lena Luthor.
 Stranger Things: Will Byers and Mike Wheeler
 Teen Wolf: Derek Hale and Stiles Stilinski.
 The Falcon and the Winter Soldier: Falcon and Bucky Barnes.
 Voltron: Legendary Defender: Shiro and Adam.
 Wednesday: Wednesday and Enid both have male love interests in the first season while Netflix hosted a promotional event called "Wednesgay" and hid replies on tweets calling Wednesday gay.

Some series did portray a same-sex relationship after being criticized for queerbaiting:
Killing Eve: The series was criticized for queerbaiting with the relationship of the main characters Eve and Villanelle in seasons 1 and 2. After they kissed in season 3, critics reassessed the series's approach to their relationship.
Supernatural: The relationship between Castiel and Dean Winchester was seen as queerbaiting by fans. In the fifteenth season (2020), Castiel confessed his love to Winchester immediately before dying, prompting criticism that the show was playing into the "bury your gays" trope.

Film

 Black Panther: Okoye and Ayo.
 Captain America: Civil War: Bucky Barnes and Steve Rogers.
 Fantastic Beasts: The Crimes of Grindelwald: Albus Dumbledore and Gellert Grindelwald.
 Luca: Luca and Alberto.
 Pitch Perfect: Beca and Chloe.
 Star Wars: The Rise of Skywalker: Finn and Poe.
The Yin-Yang Master: Dream of Eternity:  Qing Ming and Bo Ya.
 Thor: Ragnarok: Valkyrie.
 Thor: Love and Thunder: Valkyrie and Korg.

Anime
Izetta: The Last Witch: Izetta and Princess Finé.
Sound! Euphonium: Kumiko Ōmae and Reina Kōsaka.

Social media
On April Fool's Day 2020, content creators, who were mostly straight men, started to post short videos and challenges on social media, mostly TikTok and Instagram, lip-singing to will.i.am's "Boys & Girls" and pretending to come out as bisexual. In 2021, Alpha House influencers were accused of queerbaiting, while other straight web personalities received the same accusations. Some influencers came out after being accused of queerbaiting. Noah Beck was also accused of queerbaiting while he kept confirming his identity as straight.
 
Many "challenges" or "trends" on TikTok or Instagram were accused of queerbaiting. This includes kissing others of the same gender, posting false coming out narratives, or falsely claiming to be in a same-sex relationship. Many celebrities, including Billie Eilish and Normani, were accused of queerbaiting for their posts on Instagram.

Although this has been criticised, others have argued that the popularity of this trend is an example of the growing acceptance of LGBT people and (among males) a homosocial embrace of a "softer" form of masculinity.

Other media
In music, Katy Perry's 2008 song "I Kissed a Girl" raised concerns because, according to one reviewer, "its appropriation of the gay lifestyle exists for the sole purpose of garnering attention". Perry said in 2017 that she has done "more than [kissing a girl]" and is attracted to women, without specifying or labeling her sexuality. The singers Ariana Grande (in 2019) and Rita Ora (in 2018) were also criticized by fans for queerbaiting after their lyrics contained references to bisexual love. In response to these concerns, Ora came out as bisexual to her fans.

In Kpop, two members from the all-girls group BLACK PINK, Lisa and Rose, have had queer moments with each other. During a photoshoot in 2020 Lisa had knelt down on one knee and proposed to Rose. Lisa then shared the photo on instagram with the caption, "She said yes :)" 

Some fans have pointed out that while many Korean pop industries profit through queerbaiting, LGBT fandom members experience discrimination.

In advertising, the clothing label Calvin Klein apologized in 2019 for queerbaiting the public with an advertisement in which the model Bella Hadid kissed the character Lil Miquela.

In theater, the relationship between Albus Severus Potter and Scorpius Malfoy in Harry Potter and the Cursed Child was criticized as queerbaiting.

See also 
 LGBT marketing
 Liberal homophobia
 Media portrayal of LGBT people
 Pinkwashing (LGBT)
 Rainbow capitalism

References

Further reading 
 
 
 
 
 
 
 
 
 
 

LGBT terminology
LGBT portrayals in mass media
LGBT-related controversies
Discrimination against LGBT people
Mass media and entertainment controversies
Advertising and marketing controversies